The Kadir Has Stadium, also referred to as RHG Enertürk Enerji Stadium for sponsorship reasons, is a multi-purpose stadium in Kayseri, Turkey. It is part of complex of sports venues that are on the outskirts of the city, as part of the Atatürk Sports Complex. It  effectively replaces the ageing Kayseri Atatürk Stadium, which has been in use since the early 1960s.

It was opened with the Kayserispor match against Fenerbahçe on 8 March 2009. It is primary used  for football matches and  hosts the homes matches of Kayserispor and Kayseri Erciyesspor. The stadium has a capacity of 32,864 people (all-seated) and is totally covered.

The Kadir Has Stadyumu is one of the most modern stadiums in Turkey, and  offers a number of restaurants, cafes, and VIP areas for fans. Two brand-new shopping centres will also be located nearby, as will a car park with a capacity of 1785 cars.

The light rail system of Kayseri, Kayseray, passes close to the stadium complex, allowing travelling supporters to reach the new site with ease.

The stadium hosted its first international match when Turkey played Estonia in a 2010 World Cup Qualifier on September 5, 2009. Kadir Has Stadium is one of the 8 host stadiums of the 2013 FIFA U-20 World Cup, The stadium hosted the opening ceremony followed by the opening match between Cuba versus the Republic of Korea.

Renovation
For 2013 FIFA U-20 World Cup the Kayseri Kadir Has Stadium was renovated to meet regulations and requirements of UEFA. The c-values have been improved to a minimum c=90 for all seats. Furthermore, the VIP hospitality area has been extended, media facilities have been brought up to date, and public restroom facilities improved.

See also
Kadir Has Spor Salonu

References

External links 

Official site for EURO 2016 Bid Turkey – Kadir Has Stadium
City Council information on new stadium
Construction Photos
Venue information

Football venues in Turkey
Sports venues completed in 2009
Sport in Kayseri
Multi-purpose stadiums in Turkey
Süper Lig venues
Buildings and structures in Kayseri
Kayserispor
Kayseri Erciyesspor